George Feldstein (born 1941 in Manhattan, New York, died November 5, 2014) was an engineer known for his contributions to audio-visual technologies. Feldstein was responsible for the creation of several audio and video control devices, such as a remote for 35mm projects, the first HD digital touch panel, and the RF wireless control system. Feldstein holds 14 patents. Feldstein was the founder and CEO of Crestron Electronics, an audiovisual technologies company. Feldstein holds awards from InfoComm International and the New Jersey Inventors Hall of Fame for his contributions to the AV industry.

Education 
Feldstein received his B.S. in electronic engineering from New York University.

References 

20th-century American inventors
1941 births
Engineers from New York City
People from Manhattan
New York University alumni
2014 deaths